Notker or Notger is a masculine Germanic given name. It may refer to:

Historical
Notker the Stammerer ("Notker I"), Latin poet, possibly composer and monk in Saint Gall
Notker Physicus ("Notker II"), physician and painter
Notker Labeo ("Notker III"), a monk in Saint Gall and author
Notker (abbot of Saint Gall), nephew of Notker Physicus
Notker of Liège, provost of Saint Gall and later first Prince-Bishop of Liège

Contemporary
Notker Füglister (1931-1996), Catholic theologian
Notker Wolf (born 1940), the ninth Abbot Primate of the Benedictine Confederation of the Order of Saint Benedict